The 1982 Fischer-Grand Prix was a men's tennis tournament played on indoor hard courts at the Wiener Stadthalle in Vienna, Austria that was part of the 1982 Volvo Grand Prix. It was the eighth edition of the tournament and was held from 18 October until 24 October 1982. First-seeded Brian Gottfried won the singles title, his third at the event after 1977 and 1980.

Finals

Singles

 Brian Gottfried defeated  Bill Scanlon 6–1, 6–4, 6–0
 It was Gottfried's 2nd singles title of the year and the 24th of his career.

Doubles

 Henri Leconte /  Pavel Složil defeated  Mark Dickson /  Terry Moor 6–1, 7–6
 It was Leconte's 3rd title of the year and the 4th of his career. It was Složil's 8th title of the year and the 11th of his career.

References

External links
 ATP tournament profile
 ITF tournament edition details

 
Fischer-Grand Prix
Vienna Open
Vienna